The North Okkalapa General Hospital is an affiliated teaching hospital of the University of Medicine 2, Yangon, located in North Okkalapa Township in the eastern part of Yangon, Myanmar.

Structure
The North Okkalapa General Hospital was affiliated to the University of Medicine 2, Yangon in 1970. On 25 September 1996 the University moved to its present location in North Okkalapa beside the hospital.
The hospital was originally designed to hold 400 beds. Although the building has not been expanded, it now holds 800 beds.
In 2002 North Okkalapa General Hospital was the fourth in the country to establish a Neurology Center. As of 2007 it had two neurologists and one neurosurgeon.

Fundraising
On 12 September 1998 the Medical Superintendent of North Okkalapa General Hospital, Dr Myint Maung Maung represented the hospital at a ceremony where cash donations were made for a trust fund to help poor and needy patients.
On 24 August 2001 Professor Myint Maung Maung spoke at a ceremony at which K 2.46 million was distributed to buy medical equipment for the North Okkalapa General Hospital.

Patients
A significant number of the patients are poor.

A study was made of 2,613 infants delivered at North Okkalapa General Hospital between January and September 1990.
21.1% of the babies had low birth weight, with 18.1% being due to intrauterine growth retardation and 3% with preterm births.
Patients who have been involved in traffic accidents often cannot afford to buy implants.

The hospital staff understand the latest orthopedic care technologies, but lack the funds to buy instruments such as curved awls and reamer.
Pre-operative surgical planning is handicapped by the need to conserve X-ray film.

In April 2009 there was an epidemic of diarrhea in North Okkalapa Township. Local hospitals admitted over 100 people suffering from severe diarrhea.
There were rumors that the diarrhea was caused by cholera and that some deaths had occurred. However officials at the Ministry of Health and North Okkalapa General Hospital refused to provide any information.

Main Department
 Admin Department
 Emergency Department
 Medical Department
 Surgical Department
 Orthopaedic Department
 Paediatric Department
 Obstetric & Gynaecology Department
 Neurosurgical Department

Specialities
 Emergency Medicine
 Cardiac Medical Department
 Chest Medical Department
 Neuro Medical Department
 Hepatology Department
 Haematology Department
 Ophthalmology Department
 Orthopaedics Department
 Dermatology Department
 Radiology Department
 Special Care Baby Unit
 Nuclear Medicine Department
 Physical Medicine & Rehabilitation
 Diabetic Clinic
 Dentistry Clinic
 Psychiatric Medicine
 ENT Clinic

Diagnostic Department
 Radiology Department
 Pathology Department

Supportive Department
 Forensic Medicine Department
 Blood Bank
 Medicinal Record Department
 Medical Social Worker Department
 Medical Store
 Kitchen
 Laundry
 Motor Transport

See also
 List of hospitals in Yangon

References

Hospital buildings completed in 1996
Hospitals in Yangon
Hospitals established in 1940